Tsui Wah Ferry Service (H. K.) Ltd is a ferry service operator in Hong Kong.

History
Tsui Wah Ferry was established in 1986. In the beginning its business only involved leasing ferries. Today the company provides passenger ferry services as well as boats for lease.

Routes
 Aberdeen via Pak Kok Tsuen to Yung Shue Wan
 Aberdeen via Stanley Blake Pier to Po Toi Island
 Ma Liu Shui via Sham Chung and Lai Chi Chong to Tap Mun
 Ma Liu Shui to Tung Ping Chau
 Wong Shek Pier via Ko Lau Wan to Tap Mun
 Wong Shek Pier via Wan Tsai (Nam Fung Wan) to Chek Keng
 Aberdeen to Cheung Chau (Run by its subsidiary - Maris Ferry). (Discontinued since 1st January, 2020)

References

External links

Official website

Ferry transport in Hong Kong
Transport operators of Hong Kong